Samuel Besler (15 December 1574, in Brzeg – 19 July 1625) was a German-Polish composer. He was cantor at St. Bernhardinus, Breslau, in 1602, then rector of the Gymnasium from 1605. As with Jakob Meiland in the generation before him, and Melchior Vulpius in his own generation, his St. Matthew Passion follows the model of Johann Walter's Lutheran historia, but with more elaborate choral numbers.

Works
St Matthew Passion
St John Passion

References

External links 
 Scores by Samuel Besler in digital library Polona

1574 births
1625 deaths
17th-century classical composers
German Baroque composers
German male classical composers
German classical composers
Polish Baroque composers
17th-century male musicians